The Gălăuțaș is a small river in the Gurghiu Mountains, Harghita County, central Romania. Its name is from the Hungarian "galóca", meaning "amanita" (mushroom). It is a left tributary of the river Mureș. It flows through the municipality Gălăuțaș, and joins the Mureș in the village Gălăuțaș.

References

Rivers of Romania
Rivers of Harghita County